Anne Jahren (born 20 June 1963) is a Norwegian former cross-country skier who competed from 1982 to 1990. She won a complete set of medals at the Winter Olympics with a gold in the 4 × 5 km relay (1984), a silver in the 4 × 5 km relay (1988), and a bronze in the 20 km (1984).

Jahren also won four medals at the FIS Nordic World Ski Championships, including one gold (10 km: 1987), two silvers (4 × 5 km relay: 1985, 1987), and one bronze (4 × 5 km relay: 1989). She also finished 13th in the women's Adelskalender in the Norwegian skiing Championships. Representing Bærums Skiklub, Jahren also won two World Cup events in her career (1986, 1987).

In 1984 she won the silver medal at the Norwegian championships in 10 km cross-country running, representing IL Tyrving.

She has her education from the Norwegian School of Sport Sciences.

Cross-country skiing results
All results are sourced from the International Ski Federation (FIS).

Olympic Games
 3 medals – (1 gold, 1 silver, 1 bronze)

World Championships
4 medals – (1 gold, 2 silver, 1 bronze)

World Cup

Season standings

Individual podiums
 2 victories 
 14 podiums

Team podiums
 7 victories 
 14 podiums 

Note:   Until the 1999 World Championships and the 1994 Olympics, World Championship and Olympic races were included in the World Cup scoring system.

References

External links
 

1963 births
Living people
Norwegian female cross-country skiers
Olympic cross-country skiers of Norway
Cross-country skiers at the 1984 Winter Olympics
Cross-country skiers at the 1988 Winter Olympics
Olympic gold medalists for Norway
Olympic silver medalists for Norway
Olympic bronze medalists for Norway
Norwegian School of Sport Sciences alumni
Norwegian female long-distance runners
Olympic medalists in cross-country skiing
FIS Nordic World Ski Championships medalists in cross-country skiing
Medalists at the 1984 Winter Olympics
Medalists at the 1988 Winter Olympics
Sportspeople from Bærum